Matru Devo Bhava is a 1993 Telugu drama film written and directed by K. Ajay Kumar.

The film won the National Film Award for Best Lyrics by Veturi for the song "Raalipoye Puvva" and Filmfare Best Film Award (Telugu). The film was dubbed in Tamil as Thaai Ullam. The film won two Nandi Awards.

The film is a remake of the Malayalam hit film Akashadoothu (1993) by Sibi Malayil.

Production
K.S. Rama Rao saw the film and bought the remake rights for Telugu. Rama Rao brought Madhavi in to reprise her role from Akashadoothu since she was also a familiar face to the Telugu audience. Major portions of the Telugu remake were shot in the same locations as the original film.

In 2008, the movie was remade in Hindi as Tulsi by the same producer-director duo, but with Manisha Koirala and Irrfan Khan.

Plot
Satyam (Nassar) is a driver and his wife Sarada (Madhavi) is a music teacher. They were both orphans brought up in the Seva Ashram (run by Charuhasan). Sarada and Satyam have four kids. Satyam, though good at heart, is addicted to liquor. Apparao (Tanikella Bharani), a toddy milk vendor, has an eye on Sarada. When Satyam discovers Apparao making advances on Sarada, he assaults him in front of everyone. Avenging the assault, Apparao kills Satyam. Sarada, who is diagnosed with cancer, wants her children to be brought up in a family atmosphere rather than in the Ashram and the children are adopted by different families.

Cast
 Madhavi as Sarada
 Nassar as Satyam
 Nirmalamma
 Y. Vijaya as Parvatamma
 Charuhasan as Swami
 Subbaraya Sharma as Ananthaswami
 Sarathi as Suryam as toddy shop owner
 Maharshi Raghava as Doctor
 Tanikella Bharani as Apparao
 Baby Seena as Radha
Master Martin
 Brahmanandam
 Teja P as Child actor

Sound track
The music for this film was composed by M. M. Keeravani. This album featured four tracks, which were highly successful. The track "Venuvai Vachanu", sung by K. S. Chithra was a huge chart buster and won a Nandi Award for best playback singer female. All the lyrics are written by Veturi and he won his first National Award for best lyrics category for the track "Raalipoyye Poova".

Awards
Nandi Awards - 1993
Third Best Feature Film - Bronze - K. S. Rama Rao
Best Female Playback Singer - K. S. Chitra

References

External links
 

1993 films
1990s Telugu-language films
Indian drama films
Films scored by M. M. Keeravani
Telugu remakes of Malayalam films
1993 drama films